Baron Trenck is a comic opera in three acts loosely based on the life of Baron Franz von der Trenck. The original German-language work was composed by Felix Albini to a libretto by Alfred Maria Willner and Robert Bodanzky and premiered at the  Stadttheater in Leipzig in 1908. The English version, adapted by Frederick Franklin Schrader and Henry Blossom, ran for just 43 performances at the Strand Theatre in London in 1911. It starred Walter Passmore, Walter Hyde and Caroline Hatchard.

Production
Based on a 1908 German work of the same name first performed at the Stadttheater in Leipzig, Baron Trenck ran at the Whitney Theatre (Novello Theatre|Strand Theatre) from 22 April 22nd to 3 June 1911. The original score was by Felix Albini with additional music by Alfred G. Robyn to a book and lyrics by Alfred Maria Willner and Robert Bodanzky. The English version was adapted by Frederick Franklin Schrader and Henry Blossom, while the Director and choreographer was Al Holbrook and the Musical Director was Antonio de Novellis.

When Fred Whitney took over the lease of the Waldorf/Strand Theatre he chose to rename it the Whitney, opening his first season with Baron Trenck. The opening night audience were not enthusiastic with some booing during the third act at what The Stage called the "weak, heavy and uninteresting" book. However, The Stage praised the music and the general performance with The Times writing that Walter Hyde performed "heroically". Caroline Hatchard was "a bewitching Countess Lydia, at her wit's end over the constant dallying of her rapscallion lover, Trenck ... she acts interestingly, but her voice, admirably and so easily used by turns for comedy, tenderness and passion, would win its way anywhere."

Various cut and alterations were made in an attempt to improve the show but despite these it ran for just 43 performances. The Broadway production opened at the Casino Theatre in New York from 11 March to 13 April 1912 where it did even less well – running for just 40 performances.

Synopsis
The story is loosely based on the life of Baron Franz von der Trenck. The comic opera is set in Austria in 1743 during the reign of Marie Therese of Austria. Two of Baron Trenck's tenants, Nikola and Mariza, have avoided the Baron's seigniorial rights (in this sanitized version the Baron has the right to kiss the bride), by getting married without his permission. Meanwhile, the Baron saves Countess Lydia from being kidnapped by Alla Wunja and his band of marauding Haiduks. Wanting a kiss as his reward the Countess flees on horseback, assisted by Nikola and Mariza.

All later meet at the Empress's chateau, where Lydia, who secretly loves the Baron, is coerced by her Aunt Cornelia into accepting the marriage proposal of the elderly French Ambassador, the Marquis de Bouillaibaise. In a sudden twist the show ends with Countess Lydia and Baron Trenck joined together.

Cast
Walter Passmore – Nikola
Marie George – Mariza
Walter Hyde – Baron Trenck
Caroline Hatchard – Countess Lydia
William McLaughlin – Alla Wunja (Chief of the Haiduks)
Herbert Sparling – Marquis de Bouillaibaise
Molly Lowell – Cornelia
Rutland Barrington – Herr Dinkelspieler-Kietzerlmayer (Master of Ceremonies, afterwards Major Domo to the Empress)
Norman Greene – Herald
Johnny Danvers – Wurzberger (a Court Poet)
Charles Ure – Count Von Grazt
Katherine Fielder – Countess Von Grazt
Zoe Gordon – Fortuna
Eleanor Wilson – First Page
Dora Christian – Second Page

Songs

The songs included:

Act 1: A Farmyard in Slavonia
Opening Chorus: Blend Your Voices – Mariza, Nikola, Master of Ceremonies and Chorus
Oh Save Me – Lydia, Mariza, Nikola, Master of Ceremonies
This Handsome Soldier is too Bold – Lydia, Mariza and Nikola
You Villains – Lydia, Trenck, Nikola, Alla Wunja, Haiduks Chorus
Act 2: The Empress Maria Theresa's Chateau, near Vienna
How splendid these Halls – Herald and Chorus
Miriza Darling here you are – Mariza and Nikola
A Pandour Does His Duty – Mariza, Cornelia, Nikola, Wurzburger, Master of Ceremonies, Alla Wunja
Angel at Last again I Find you – Trenck and Lydia
Act 3: A Room in Cornelia's Villa in Vienna
With Song and Cheer – Lydia and Chorus
Cupid is a Merry Knave – Lydia and Trenck
Rumwid i Bum – Principals and Chorus

Other songs included:
Just Like You
A Kiss for a Dance
Once Upon a Time
Goodbye Baron
When a Pretty Girl Gets Married
In Merry, Merry May!
Things Romantic Are My Delight  (Waltz Song) – Lydia
Trenck is My Name (March Song) – Trenck

References

External links
Photographs from the 1912 Broadway production of Baron Trenck – New York Public Library Digital Collections

1911 operas
English comic operas
English-language operas
Operas
Operas based on real people
Operas set in the 18th century
Cultural depictions of military officers
Cultural depictions of Austrian men
Operas set in Austria
1911 musicals
West End musicals
Broadway musicals
British musicals